Tarnov is a village and municipality in Bardejov District in the Prešov Region of north-east Slovakia.

History
In historical records the village was first mentioned in 1355

Geography
The municipality lies at an altitude of 330 metres and covers an area of 5.844 km².
It has a population of about 380 people.

External links
 
 
http://www.statistics.sk/mosmis/eng/run.html

Villages and municipalities in Bardejov District
Šariš